For the history of the Jews in North Africa, see:

 History of the Jews in Algeria 
 History of the Jews in Egypt 
 History of the Jews in Libya 
 History of the Jews in Mauritania
 History of the Jews in Morocco 
 History of the Jews in Sudan 
 History of the Jews in Tunisia

See also
Many of the following articles relate to Jewish history in North Africa:

 African Jews
 History of the Jews in the Byzantine Empire
 History of the Jews under Muslim rule
 History of the Jews in the Ottoman Empire
 Jewish exodus from Arab and Muslim countries
 List of Jews from the Arab world
 Islamic Spain and Reconquista
 Sephardi Jews
 Berber Jews
 Maghrebi Jews